Drums Across the River  is a 1954 American Technicolor Western film directed by Nathan Juran and starring Audie Murphy, Walter Brennan and Lyle Bettger.

Plot
Gary Brannon, is a peaceful homesteader living a quiet existence with his father Sam. Frank Walker is hoping to open up the Ute Indian territory for gold-mining purposes and tries to foment a war between the Utes and the local whites, while he steals a gold shipment and pins the blame on Gary. Gary starts off hating the Utes because they were responsible for killing his mother but gradually comes to be on their side and wants to expose the machinations of Walker.

Cast

Production
The film was shot mostly on the Universal backlot, with location filming at Barton Flats, California. This was Murphy's last film with Nathan Juran.

References

External links
 
 
 
 

1954 films
1954 Western (genre) films
Audie Murphy
Films set in Colorado
Universal Pictures films
Films directed by Nathan Juran
American Western (genre) films
1950s English-language films
1950s American films